MAVEN is a NASA spacecraft orbiting Mars to study the loss of its atmospheric gases to space, providing insight into the history of 
the planet's climate and water. The spacecraft name is an acronym for "Mars Atmosphere and Volatile Evolution" and also a word that means "a person who has special knowledge or experience; an expert". MAVEN was launched on an Atlas V rocket from Cape Canaveral Air Force Station, Florida, on 18 November 2013 UTC and went into orbit around Mars on 22 September 2014 UTC. The mission is the first by NASA to study the Mars atmosphere. The probe is analyzing the planet's upper atmosphere and ionosphere to examine how and at what rate the solar wind is stripping away volatile compounds.

The principal investigator for the mission is Shannon Curry at the University of California, Berkeley. She took over from Bruce Jakosky of the Laboratory for Atmospheric and Space Physics at the University of Colorado Boulder, who proposed and led the mission until 2021. The project cost $582.5 million to build, launch, and operate through its two-year prime mission.

Pre-launch 

Proposed in 2006, the mission was the second of NASA's Mars Scout Program, which had previously yielded Phoenix. It was selected for development for flight in 2008.

On 2 August 2013, the MAVEN spacecraft arrived at Kennedy Space Center, in Florida to begin launch preparations.

On 1 October 2013, only seven weeks before launch, a government shutdown caused suspension of work for two days and initially threatened to force a 26-month postponement of the mission. With the spacecraft nominally scheduled to launch on 18 November 2013, a delay beyond 7 December 2013 would have caused MAVEN to miss the launch window as Mars moved too far out of alignment with the Earth.

However, two days later, on 3 October 2013, a public announcement was made that NASA had deemed the 2013 MAVEN launch so essential to ensuring future communication with current NASA assets on Mars — the rovers Opportunity and Curiosity — that emergency funding was authorized to restart spacecraft processing in preparation for an on-time launch.

Objectives 

Features on Mars that resemble dry riverbeds and the discovery of minerals that form in the presence of water indicate that Mars once had a dense enough atmosphere and was warm enough for liquid water to flow on the surface. However, that thick atmosphere was somehow lost to space. Scientists suspect that over millions of years, Mars lost 99% of its atmosphere as the planet's core cooled and its magnetic field decayed, allowing the solar wind to sweep away most of the water and volatile compounds that the atmosphere once contained.

The goal of MAVEN is to determine the history of the loss of atmospheric gases to space, providing answers about Martian climate evolution. By measuring the rate with which the atmosphere is currently escaping to space and gathering enough information about the relevant processes, scientists will be able to infer how the planet's atmosphere evolved over time. The MAVEN mission's primary scientific objectives are:

 Measure the composition and structure of the upper atmosphere and ionosphere today, and determine the processes responsible for controlling them
 Measure the rate of loss of gas from the top of the atmosphere to space, and determine the processes responsible for controlling them
 Determine properties and characteristics that will allow us to extrapolate backwards in time to determine the integrated loss to space over the four-billion-year history recorded in the geological record.

Timeline 
MAVEN launched from the Cape Canaveral Air Force Station (CCAFS) on 18 November 2013, using an Atlas V 401 launch vehicle.

In October 2014, as the spacecraft was being fine-tuned to start its primary science mission, the comet Siding Spring was also performing a close flyby of Mars. The researchers had to maneuver the craft to mitigate harmful effects of the comet, but while doing so, were able to observe the comet and perform measurements on the composition of expelled gases and dust.

On 16 November 2014, investigators completed MAVEN's commissioning activities and began its primary science mission, scheduled to last one year. During that time, MAVEN had observed a nearby comet, measured how volatile gases are swept away by solar wind, and performed four "deep dips" down to the border of the upper and lower atmospheres to better characterize the planet's entire upper atmosphere. In June 2015, the science phase was extended through September 2016, allowing MAVEN to observe the Martian atmosphere through the entirety of the planet's seasons.

On 3 October 2016, MAVEN completed one full Martian year of scientific observations. It had been approved for an additional 2-year extended mission through September 2018. All spacecraft systems were still operating as expected.

In March 2017, MAVEN's investigators had to perform a previously unscheduled maneuver to avoid colliding with Phobos the following week.

On 5 April 2019, the navigation team completed a two-month aerobraking maneuver to lower MAVEN's orbit and enable it to better serve as a communications relay for current landers as well as the rover Perseverance. With 6.6 orbits per Earth day, the lower orbit allows more frequent communication with rovers.

As of September 2020, the spacecraft is continuing its science mission as well, with all instruments still operating and with enough fuel to last at least until 2030.

On August 31, 2021, Shannon Curry became the Principal Investigator of the mission.

NASA became aware of failures in the MAVEN's inertia measurement units (IMU) in late 2021, necessary for the probe to maintain its orbit; having already moved from the main IMU to the backup one in 2017, they saw the backup ones showing signs of failure. In February 2022, both IMUs had appeared to lost the ability to perform its measurement properly. After doing a heartbeat termination to restore the use of the backup IMU, NASA engineers set to reprogram MAVEN to use an "all stellar" mode using star positions to maintain its altitude, eliminating the reliance on the IMUs. This was put into place in April 2022 and completed by May 28, 2022, but during this period, MAVEN could not be used for scientific observations or to relay communications to Earth from the rovers Curiosity and Perseverance and the Insight lander. Reduced communication was handled by other Mars orbiters.

Spacecraft overview 
MAVEN was built and tested by Lockheed Martin Space Systems. Its design is based on those of Mars Reconnaissance Orbiter and 2001 Mars Odyssey.

Relay telecommunications 

NASA's Jet Propulsion Laboratory provided an Electra ultra high frequency (UHF) relay radio payload which has a data return rate of up to 2048 kbit/s. The highly elliptical orbit of the MAVEN spacecraft may limit its usefulness as a relay for operating landers on the surface, although the long view periods of MAVEN's orbit have afforded some of the largest relay data returns to date of any Mars orbiter. During the mission's first year of operations at Mars — the primary science phase — MAVEN served as a backup relay orbiter. In the extended mission period of up to ten years, MAVEN will provide UHF relay service for present and future Mars rovers and landers.

Scientific instruments 

The University of Colorado Boulder, University of California, Berkeley, and Goddard Space Flight Center each built a suite of instruments for the spacecraft, and they include:

Built by the University of California, Berkeley Space Sciences Laboratory:

 Solar Wind Electron Analyzer (SWEA) – measures solar wind and ionosphere electrons. The goals of SWEA with respect to MAVEN are to deduce magneto-plasma topology in and above the ionosphere, and to measure atmospheric electron impact ionization effects.
 Solar Wind Ion Analyzer (SWIA) – measures solar wind and magnetosheath ion density and velocity. The SWIA therefore characterizes the nature of solar wind interactions within the upper atmosphere.
 SupraThermal And Thermal Ion Composition (STATIC) – measures thermal ions to moderate-energy escaping ions. This provides information on the current ion escape rates from the atmosphere and how rates change during various atmospheric events.
 Solar Energetic Particle (SEP) – determines the impact of SEPs on the upper atmosphere. In context with the rest of this suite, it evaluates how SEP events affect upper atmospheric structure, temperature, dynamics and escape rates.

Built by the University of Colorado Boulder Laboratory for Atmospheric and Space Physics:

 Imaging Ultraviolet Spectrometer (IUVS) – measures global characteristics of the upper atmosphere and ionosphere. The IUVS has separate far-UV and mid-UV channels, a high resolution mode to distinguish deuterium from hydrogen, optimization for airglow studies, and capabilities that allow complete mapping and nearly continuous operation.
 Langmuir Probe and Waves (LPW) – determines ionosphere properties and wave heating of escaping ions and solar extreme ultraviolet (EUV) input to atmosphere. This instrument provides better characterization of the basic state of the ionosphere and can evaluate the effects of the solar wind on the ionosphere.

Built by Goddard Space Flight Center:

 Magnetometer (MAG) – measures interplanetary solar wind and ionosphere magnetic fields.
 Neutral Gas and Ion Mass Spectrometer (NGIMS) - measures the composition and isotopes of neutral gases and ions. This instrument evaluates how the lower atmosphere can affect higher altitudes while also better characterizing the structure of the upper atmosphere from the homopause to the exobase.

SWEA, SWIA, STATIC, SEP, LPW, and MAG are part of the Particles and Fields instrument suite, IUVS is the Remote Sensing instrument suite, and NGIMS is its own eponymous suite.

Cost 

MAVEN cost US$582.5 million to build, launch, and operate for its prime mission, nearly US$100 million less than originally estimated. Of this total, US$366.8 million was for development, US$187 million for launch services, and US$35 million was for the 2-year prime mission. On average, NASA spends US$20 million annually on MAVEN's extended operations.

Results

Atmospheric loss 
Mars loses water into its thin atmosphere by evaporation. There, solar radiation can split the water molecules into their components, hydrogen and oxygen. The hydrogen, as the lightest element, then tends to rise far up to the highest levels of the Martian atmosphere, where several processes can strip it away into space, to be forever lost to the planet. This loss was thought to proceed at a fairly constant rate, but MAVEN's observations of Mars's atmospheric hydrogen through a full Martian year (almost two Earth years) show that the escape rate is highest when Mars's orbit brings it closest to the Sun, and only one-tenth as great when it is at its farthest.

On 5 November 2015, NASA announced that data from MAVEN shows that the deterioration of Mars's atmosphere increases significantly during solar storms. That loss of atmosphere to space likely played a key role in Mars's gradual shift from its carbon dioxide–dominated atmosphere – which had kept Mars relatively warm and allowed the planet to support liquid surface water – to the cold, arid planet seen today. This shift took place between about 4.2 and 3.7 billion years ago. Atmospheric loss was especially notable during an interplanetary coronal mass ejection in March 2015.

Different types of aurora 
In 2014, MAVEN researchers detected widespread aurora throughout the planet, even close to the equator. Given the localized magnetic fields on Mars (as opposed to Earth's global magnetic field), aurora appear to form and distribute in different ways on Mars, creating what scientists call diffuse aurora. Researchers determined that the source of the particles causing the aurorae were a huge surge of electrons originating from the Sun. These highly energetic particles were able to penetrate far deeper into Mars's atmosphere than they would have on Earth, creating aurora much closer to the surface of the planet (~60 km as opposed to 100–500 km on Earth).

Scientists also discovered proton aurora, different from the so-called typical aurora which is produced by electrons. Proton aurora were previously only detected on Earth.

Interaction with a comet 
The fortuitous arrival of MAVEN just before a flyby of the comet Siding Spring gave researchers a unique opportunity to observe both the comet itself as well as its interactions with the Martian atmosphere.  The spacecraft's IUVS instrument detected intense ultraviolet emissions from magnesium and iron ions, a result from the comet's meteor shower, which were much stronger than anything ever detected on Earth. The NGIMS instrument was able to directly sample dust from this Oort Cloud comet, detecting at least eight different types of metal ions.

Detection of metal ions 
In 2017, results were published detailing the detection of metal ions in Mars's ionosphere. This is the first time metal ions have been detected in any planet's atmosphere other than Earth's. It was also noted that these ions behave and are distributed differently in the atmosphere of Mars given that the red planet has a much weaker magnetic field than our own.

Impacts on future exploration 
In September 2017, NASA reported a temporary doubling of radiation levels on the surface of Mars, as well as an aurora 25 times brighter than any observed earlier. This occurred due to a massive, and unexpected, solar storm. The observation provided insight into how changes in radiation levels might impact the planet's habitability, helping NASA researchers understand how to predict as well as mitigate effects on future human Mars explorers.

See also

References

External links 

 MAVEN – NASA
 MAVEN – JPL
 MAVEN – University of Colorado Boulder
 Integration of MAVEN Propellant Tank – NASA
 SpaceflightNow MAVEN mission status center
 Released results from MAVEN

2013 in the United States
Mars Exploration Program
Satellites orbiting Mars
Lockheed Martin satellites and probes
Mars Scout Program
Missions to Mars
NASA space probes
Space probes launched in 2013
Articles containing video clips
Geography of Mars